Beelzebufo ampinga ( or ) was a particularly large species of prehistoric frog described in 2008. Common names assigned by the popular media include devil frog, devil toad, and the frog from hell.

Fossils of Beelzebufo have been recovered from strata of the Maevarano Formation in Madagascar, dating to the late Cretaceous period, its assumed to have lived 66-70 million years ago. It is considered to be closely related to Baurubatrachus from the Late Cretaceous of Brazil, with both possibly being close relatives, though not members of, the extant South American frog family Ceratophryidae.

Discovery 
The first fossil bones were found in 1993 by David W. Krause of New York's Stony Brook University, but it took 14 years for scientists Susan E. Evans, Marc E. H. Jones, and Krause to assemble enough data for publication in the Proceedings of the National Academy of Sciences, the journal of the United States National Academy of Sciences. The generic name Beelzebufo is a portmanteau of Beelzebub (a Semitic deity whose name may be translated as "Lord of the Flies", sometimes identified either as one of the chief lieutenants, or alter ego of the Christian Devil) and bufo (Latin for "toad"). The specific name ampinga means "shield" in Malagasy.

Some 75 fossil isolated partial bones have been found. Some portions of articulated skull are also known: specimen FMNH PR 2512 (which preserves most of the braincase, part of the palate, and part of the skull roof) and specimen FMNH PR 2512 (which preserves one of the posterior flanges). Researchers have been able to reconstruct parts of the frog's skeleton, including nearly the entire skull.

Description 
 
In early studies, it is suggested that snout-vent lengths of up to 42.5 cm (16.7 in). But in later studies, animals of this species estimated to have grown to at least  (snout-vent length), which is around the size a modern African bullfrog can reach. The head of Beelzebufo was very big, and bones of the skull roof show a rugous external surface, indicating at least parts of the head may have borne bony scales, called scutes.

The skull sutures are open in even the largest specimens of Beelzebufo, showing that it might have grown even bigger.

Paleobiology 

Beelzebufo most likely was a predator whose expansive mouth allowed it to eat relatively large prey, perhaps even juvenile dinosaurs.

Paleobiogeography 
The fossils of Beelzebufo are from Madagascar, which, while still attached to India, separated from the coast of Somalia in the earliest stage of the Late Jurassic. Beelzebufo resembles horned frogs (Ceratophryidae) of South America, which raised the possibility of a close biogeographic link between Madagascar and South America during the Cretaceous. The initial description of Beelzebufo hypothesis reignited interest and research into skeletal variation among living members of the Ceratophyridae. These investigations suggest several of the similarities between Beelzebufo and horned frogs may have evolved by convergence; a possibility certainly acknowledged in the descriptions of Beelzebufo.

A study from 2018 suggested that Beelzebufo, and other extinct frogs with ceratophryid-like traits, such as Baurubatrachus, were instead part of a more ancient group of Neobatrachia, distantly related to horned frogs. However, a 2022 study recovered Baurubatrachus and Beelzebufo as sister species, with the clade formed by the two genera in turn being the sister clade to extant Ceratophyridae. Thus, Beelzebufo could represent a taxon on the stem of crown group Ceratophryidae as previously suggested.

References

External links

Cretaceous frogs
Late Cretaceous amphibians
Maevarano fauna
Fossil taxa described in 2008
Maastrichtian life
Beelzebub
Neobatrachia